Marron Curtis Fort (October 24, 1938 – December 18, 2019) was an American-born German linguist and professor who specialized in the study of Saterland Frisian and Low German (Plattdeutsch) spoken in northern Germany. Fort was a German citizen and lived in Leer. Fort's work in print and appearances in radio and television have contributed greatly to the preservation and furthering of the Saterland Frisian language and Low German language and culture in general.

Academic career 
Fort was born in Boston to Alice and Marron William Fort. His father was the first African-American to receive a Ph.D. in engineering. After attending boarding school in New Hampshire, Fort began his studies in Princeton University in 1957, including German studies, English, Dutch studies, Scandinavian studies, and Mathematics. In 1961 he transferred to the University of Pennsylvania in Philadelphia. In 1963 Fort participated in a university exchange program at Albert-Ludwigs-Universität Freiburg. In 1965 Fort completed his PhD with Professor Alfred Senn at University of Pennsylvania with a dissertation on the Low German language spoken in Vechta.

From 1969 until 1985 Marron C. Fort taught as Professor of German at the University of New Hampshire. During this time, specifically 1976–77 and 1982–83, Fort lectured as a guest professor at University of Oldenburg and began to study Saterland Frisian language as well as East Frisian Low Saxon. At the University of Oldenburg, Fort was a Senior Researcher beginning in 1983 and was in charge of the Center for Low German and Saterland Frisian until his retirement in 2003. Fort lived in Germany after 1982.

As part of his involvement with Saterland Frisian, Fort published a Saterland Frisian dictionary as well as two volumes of folk tales in that language.  He also prepared a translation of the New Testament and Psalms.

Honors 
Fort received numerous awards, honors and titles from academic institutions, community organizations and cultural councils in northern Germany.

Works 
 Saterfriesisches Wörterbuch. Helmut Buske Verlag, Hamburg 1980. 
 Saterfriesisches Volksleben. Ostendorp, Rhauderfehn 1985. 
 Saterfriesische Stimmen. Ostendorp, Rhauderfehn 1990. 
  Oldenburg 2003. 
 Saterfriesisches Wörterbuch. 2., completely revised and expanded volume. With 1 CD-ROM, 2015, .

References

External links 
 
 Deutsche Welle report on Dr. Marron C. Fort
 Hanne Klöver: Saterfriesisch: Mehr Begriffe als Menschen on NDR.DE on February 19, 2015
 Interview with Dr. Fort on German television – RosenScholz talk show

Germanists
University of Pennsylvania alumni
Princeton University alumni
University of New Hampshire faculty
Academic staff of the University of Oldenburg
Linguists from Germany
Linguists from the United States
1938 births
2019 deaths
American emigrants to Germany
Writers from Boston
East Frisian language